Pseudamblytelus orbicollis is a species of beetles in the family Carabidae, the only species in the genus Pseudamblytelus.

References

Psydrinae
Monotypic Carabidae genera